Chauvin is a village in east central Alberta, Canada. It is also the home of Susie the Softball, the world's largest softball.

History
Chauvin started as a railroad siding in 1908.  It was incorporated as a village in 1912. The village has the name of George Von Chauvin, a railroad official.

Demographics 

In the 2016 Census of Population conducted by Statistics Canada, the Village of Chauvin recorded a population of 335 living in 145 of its 156 total private dwellings, a  change from its 2011 population of 334.

The population of the Village of Chauvin according to its 2016 municipal census is 345, a  change from its 2011 municipal census population of 340.

See also 
List of communities in Alberta
List of villages in Alberta

References

External links 

1912 establishments in Alberta
Villages in Alberta